Alexander Anne or Aune (died 1439) was an English lawyer and politician.

Alexander Anne (also Aune, de Aune, or de Anne) was originally from Frickley in Yorkshire and served as a Justice of the Peace of that county as well as Middlesex.
A Citizen-Draper of London, he held numerous offices, including undersheriff for London in 1423 and escheator for Middlesex in 1432. He was a Member (MP) of the Parliament of England for Middlesex in 1430/31, 1432, and 1436/37. Anne was also Recorder of London from 1435 to his death in 1439.

References

Year of birth missing
1439 deaths
Members of the Parliament of England for Middlesex
English MPs 1431
English MPs 1432
English MPs 1437
Politicians from Yorkshire
English lawyers
Recorders of London